The 2018 AFL Women's Grand Final was an Australian rules football match held on 24 March 2018 to determine the premiers of the 2018 AFL Women's season, the league's second season. The Bulldogs claimed their first AFL Women's premiership, whilst Brisbane suffered their second consecutive loss by six points in a Grand Final.

Background
The Australian Football League (AFL) continued with the top-two qualification system, whereby the two highest ranked clubs would qualify for the grand final, rather than having a finals series. The date of the match clashed with the opening round of the 2018 AFL season, however the start time of 12:35 pm Australian Eastern Daylight Saving Time allowed the match to conclude before the first AFL premiership match to be held later that day, which featured the Brisbane men's team.

Qualification

Brisbane's surprise 40-point win against Greater Western Sydney saw them leapfrog ,  and  into second place. The Bulldogs narrowly defeated Melbourne the following night, thereby clinching qualification and keeping Brisbane's season alive.  were considered strong favourites in the final match of the regular season against , but Collingwood ran away with a surprise victory to ensure that Brisbane retained second position and qualified for their second consecutive grand final. Adelaide's match was watched on television by the Brisbane players, who celebrated wildly after it concluded. Despite the loss, Adelaide coach Bec Goddard congratulated the Western Bulldogs and Brisbane Lions for clinching the two spots in the grand final, saying "the two sides...are in there and I'm sure they will have a cracking contest next week."

Venue
It was announced by the AFL that the 2018 AFL Women's Grand Final would be played at Ikon Park. The decision was made on the basis that Ikon Park could manage a greater capacity than the Western Bulldogs' home ground the Whitten Oval. It was the first time an AFL Women's Grand Final was played in Melbourne.

Match summary
The game was played in wet and blustery conditions, with heavy rain falling in the hours leading up to the game. This kept the crowd numbers down, with most huddled under the sheltered areas, and caused the scheduled pre-match entertainment by Missy Higgins to be cancelled. The first quarter opened with a Brisbane goal. Speedster Kate McCarthy brought the ball out of the centre and delivered it to forward Jess Wuetschner, who found Sophie Conway unmarked 20 metres out from goal with a precision pass. Conway then converted.

Conway had another opportunity a few minutes later, but chose to attempt a snap shot herself rather than send the ball to Wuetschner, who was alone in the goal square, and missed everything. Conway's goal was the only one kicked by either side in the first half. The Western Bulldogs seemed unable to get past key Brisbane defender Kate Lutkins. Kaitlyn Ashmore also had an opportunity from 15 metres out just before the half time siren, but also missed everything.

After the half time break, the rain abated, and Bulldogs midfielders Ellie Blackburn and Emma Kearney began to wrest control of the centre of the oval. The game remained tough and physical, with Kearney, who was well-contained by Brisbane tagger Nat Exon for most of the day, turning aside assistance offered by one of the trainers, and there were injury concerns for Kirsty Lamb. Deanna Berry somehow evaded two defenders and managed to kick the Bulldogs' first goal with a long shot from outside the 50-metre arc.

This was followed in quick succession by another, dribbled in by Kirsten McLeod, who had been brought in to replace the suspended Katie Brennan, but had not touched the ball in the first half. Monique Conti, an 18-year-old who also played in the basketball grand final with the Melbourne Boomers, and wound up being voted best on ground, concluded the third term with a goal from a ball delivered to her by McLeod, giving the Bulldogs a 14-point lead.

The Brisbane Lions fought back in the final quarter. Wuetschner dribbled in a goal to peg the Bulldogs' lead back to eight points. Kearney responded with a fourth Bulldogs goal, but Wuetschner kicked her second in reply. In the dying minutes of the game, the Brisbane Lions surged forward, seeking a fourth major that would tie the game and send it into extra time. The ball was marked in the dying seconds of the game by Bulldogs' defender Naomi Ferres, who grasped it as the final siren sounded.

When it came time to raise the winner's cup at the end of medal presentations, acting captain Ellie Blackburn declared: "I can't hold that cup up alone – KB, get up here!" The two raised the cup together, Brennan lifting her shirt to reveal the Bulldogs' guernsey beneath. The gesture invoked memories of the 2016 AFL Grand Final, when injured Bulldogs skipper Robert Murphy was similarly called up on stage to raise the cup.

Teams
The teams were announced on 22 March. Western Bulldogs captain Katie Brennan was a prominent exclusion from the team, after she was suspended by the Tribunal for a sling tackle executed in the final match of the home-and-away season against Melbourne. The tribunal's decision to reject Brennan's appeal was met with surprise by some, who thought the punishment was not in line with expectations in the men's game. Brennan subsequently lodged a proceeding with the Australian Human Rights Commission in an attempt to have the AFL amend the differences between the AFLW regulations and the AFL regulations. Brisbane named an unchanged line-up.

Scorecard

Media coverage
The 2018 AFL Women's Grand Final was broadcast on the Seven Network, as part of a broadcasting rights deal that saw Seven West Media gain broadcasting rights to all matches of the 2018 AFL Women's season, airing on the Seven Network, 7mate, or the video on demand service, PLUS7. Outside of Australia, it was made available live and for replay on the Watch AFL subscription web site and app.

References

External links
Official AFL Women's website

Grand Final
AFL Women's Grand Final 2018
AFL Women's Grand Finals
Brisbane Lions
Western Bulldogs
Sports competitions in Melbourne
Australian rules football in Victoria (Australia)